Sonam Dolma Brauen (born 1953) is a Tibetan-Swiss contemporary painter and sculptor.

Life and career

Early life 
Sonam Dolma was born in Kongpo, Tibet (today Kongpo, Gongbo'gyamda County, Nyingchi Prefecture, Tibetan Autonomous Region, China), the daughter of Kunsang (Mola) Wangmo, a former Bhikkhuni, and Tsering. The family left eastern Tibet when the 14th Dalai Lama refuged in 1959 to Dharamshala in northern India, crossing the Himalayas on foot. Sonam's father and her younger sister died on the journey. Sonam grew up in nearby Dharamsala, Shimla, Himachal Pradesh, during the Sino-Indian War. In autumn 1962, the family had to move to Mussoorie, Uttarakhand, where Sonam took a job waitressing in a Tibetan restaurant. One day she served tea to a Swiss from Bern, an ethnologist, fascinated by the Tibetan culture. They fell in love, and married, and soon after, Martin Brauen took Sonam and her mother Kunsang back with him to Switzerland: I would never have decided for myself to leave if Martin had not come and asked me to marry him. Settled in Bern, she learnt Swiss-German. Now, everywhere Sonam goes, she brings with her tsa tsa (small Votive offerings in the Mahāyāna Buddhism) that her parents carried out from Tibet: They make us remember.

Education 
Sonam Dolma Brauen began her training as artist at the Art School Bern and was educated by Arthur Freuler, Leopold Schropp, Mariann Bissegger, and Serge Fausto Sommer. She moved to New York City in 2008, where she lived for four years in Manhattan, New York City; her studio was located in Long Island City. Thenafter she stayed for a while in the USA, in Korea, Italy and went back to Switzerland.

Personal life 
Married to the Swiss ethnologist Martin Brauen, Sonam Dolma's daughter Yangzom Brauen (born in 1981) is a Swiss-Tibetan actress, writer (Eisenvogel) and director (Who Killed Johnny). Eisenvogel ("Iron Bird"), her daughter's 2009 novel, is dedicated to Sonam Dolma's mother Kunsang and her escape from Tibet. The book tells about Yangzom's youth and their common life in exile, and became a bestseller in German-speaking countries. It was later published in English as Across Many Mountains. Sonam's son, Tashi Brauen, is also an artist.

Work 
Her paintings, sculptures and installations are exhibited in Germany, Italy, South Korea, Switzerland, USA and in Museum of Contemporary Tibetan Art, Netherlands.

Paintings 

Sonam Dolma Brauen's works is abstractly and has clear conceptions of her role as an “ethnic painter”, and is influenced of Buddhist concepts on her work. Her paintings represent the Tibetan Contemporary art.

Installations 
After moving to New York City, Brauen began working more with installations using materials and objects like used monk robes from Asia, plaster, empty ammunition shells. Provocative works utilize teeth and used ammunition in pieces that comment on contemporary society. Her installations express ongoing themes that preoccupy her: Machoism and its relation to power, money and war; and the political situation in her home country Tibet.

Critics 
The art scope magazine claims, one would think, given Dolma’s origins ... that her art would reflect overtly political or nationalist themes. Or that, being Tibetan-born, she would follow the traditional artistic mores of strict Buddhist iconography. Rather, Dolma’s wall-spanning acrylics and floor-spanning installations tackle a thoroughly rougher territory: the expanse of cultural folly and the crimes of emotion.

Further reading 
 Brauen, Yangzom (2009), Eisenvogel (Across Many Mountains). Heyne Verlag (Random House), München, .

References

External links 

 
 

1953 births
Living people
People from Bern
Tibetan women
Tibetan painters
Tibetan diaspora
20th-century Swiss painters
20th-century Swiss sculptors
Buddhist artists
Tibetan Buddhists from Switzerland
Swiss people of Tibetan descent
20th-century women artists
People from Shimla district
21st-century Swiss painters
21st-century Swiss sculptors
21st-century women artists
21st-century Indian painters
21st-century Indian sculptors
Women artists from Himachal Pradesh
Swiss women sculptors
Indian women painters
Indian contemporary sculptors
Indian contemporary painters
Indian women contemporary artists
Painters from Himachal Pradesh
20th-century Indian women
20th-century Indian people